Alain Masson (born 25 March 1961) is a Canadian former cyclist and cross-country skier who competed in the 1984 Summer Olympics, in the 1988 Winter Olympics, and in the 1992 Winter Olympics.

References

1961 births
Living people
Canadian male cyclists
Canadian male cross-country skiers
Olympic cyclists of Canada
Olympic cross-country skiers of Canada
Cyclists at the 1984 Summer Olympics
Cyclists from Quebec
Cross-country skiers at the 1988 Winter Olympics
Cross-country skiers at the 1992 Winter Olympics
Sportspeople from Laval, Quebec
20th-century Canadian people
21st-century Canadian people